SM U-18 was one of 329 submarines serving in the Imperial German Navy in World War I. U-18 engaged in the commerce warfare in the First Battle of the Atlantic.

Service history
Beginning in October 1914, she was commanded by Kaptlt. von Hennig.

On her third mission, on 23 November U-18 penetrated the fleet anchorage of Scapa Flow via Hoxa Sound, following a steamer through the boom and entering the anchorage with little difficulty. However, the fleet was absent, being dispersed in anchorages on the west coast of Scotland and Ireland. As U-18 was making her way back out through Hoxa Sound to the open sea, her periscope was spotted by a guard boat. The trawler Dorothy Gray altered course and rammed the periscope, rendering it unserviceable. U-18 then suffered a failure of her diving plane motor and the boat became unable to maintain her depth, at one point even impacting the seabed. She was rammed a second time by destroyer  and eventually, her captain was forced to surface and scuttle his command just outside the Hoxa Gate; all crew members, except one, were picked up by British boats. One crew member perished, while the remaining 22 were interned as prisoners of war.

References

Notes

Citations

Bibliography

External links

Room 40:  original documents, photos and maps about World War I German submarine warfare and British Room 40 Intelligence from The National Archives, Kew, Richmond, UK.

U-boats commissioned in 1912
1912 ships
World War I submarines of Germany
Maritime incidents in November 1914
U-boats sunk in 1914
U-boats sunk by British warships
Type U 17 submarines
Ships built in Danzig
World War I shipwrecks in the North Sea
U-boats sunk in collisions